American singer Banks has released four studio albums, one remix album, three extended plays, twenty-one singles, two promotional singles and sixteen music videos.

Albums

Studio albums

Remix albums

Extended plays

Singles

Promotional singles

Other charted songs

Guest appearances

Music videos

Notes

References

External links
 
 
 
 

Discographies of American artists
Electronic music discographies
Pop music discographies
Contemporary R&B discographies